Greatest Hits… and Then Some is the first greatest hits compilation released by American country music artist Aaron Tippin. Released on RCA Nashville in 1997, it is composed of nine tracks from his first five studio albums, as well as four newly recorded tracks: "Cold Gray Kentucky Morning", "A Door", "That's What Happens When I Hold You" and "If Only Your Eyes Could Lie". Of these, "That's What Happens When I Hold You" and "A Door" were released, respectively reaching #50 and #65 on the Billboard Hot Country Singles & Tracks (now Hot Country Songs) charts. After this album's release, Tippin exited RCA Nashville's roster, and signed in 1998 to Lyric Street Records.

Track listing

Personnel
The following musicians played on the newly recorded tracks.
Pat Coil – keyboards
Stuart Duncan – fiddle
Paul Franklin – steel guitar
Steve Gibson – acoustic guitar, electric guitar
John Hobbs – keyboards
Brent Mason – electric guitar
Judy Rodman – background vocals
John Wesley Ryles – background vocals
Aaron Tippin- lead vocals
Biff Watson – acoustic guitar
Dennis Wilson – background vocals
Lonnie Wilson – drums
Glenn Worf – bass guitar

Chart performance

References
Allmusic (see infobox)

1997 greatest hits albums
Aaron Tippin albums
RCA Records compilation albums